"Stay Young is a song written by Benny Gallagher and Graham Lyle, and originally recorded on their 1975 album Breakaway.  In the United States, the song was covered by American country music artist Don Williams.  It was released in November 1983 as the third single from his album Yellow Moon.  It was his fifteenth number one country hit.  The single went to number one for one week and spent a total of twelve weeks on the country chart.

Charts

Weekly charts

Year-end charts

References
 

Don Williams songs
1975 songs
1983 singles
Gallagher and Lyle songs
Song recordings produced by Garth Fundis
Songs written by Graham Lyle
Songs written by Benny Gallagher
MCA Records singles